In Full Color: Finding My Place in a Black and White World is a memoir by American transracial activist Rachel Dolezal. It was published in 2017 by BenBella Books, almost two years after the controversy about her racial identity in June 2015. The Guardian reported that 30 publishing houses turned down the manuscript before BenBella Books printed it in March 2017.

Summary 
In Full Color is an overview of Dolezal's life with an emphasis on how she came to identify as "black". Dolezal begins by describing her upbringing by "fundamentalist Christian" parents in the foothills of the Rocky Mountains in Montana, United States. From an early age, she describes being fascinated with Africa and African culture. While Dolezal was a teenager her parents, Larry and Ruthanne Dolezal, adopted four African-American children. Dolezal describes that "while I was teaching my younger siblings about Black culture and history: I began to feel even more connected to it myself. I began to see the world through Black eyes and anything that had to do with Blackness or Africa always grabbed my attention." 

Dolezal describes how difficult it became to communicate how she identified herself.  Dolezal became a self-described "academic activist" joining the local chapter of the NAACP and serving on a police oversight board. She also describes some of the racism Izaiah and Franklin experienced at school.

Reception 
In Full Color had a mixed reception. Brian Josephs from Spin wrote that "her writing lacks the empathy required to sell herself as, in her words, 'a fully conscious, woke soul sista.'" Baz Dreisinger's highly critical review in The Washington Post noted that: "Dolezal's conception of blackness is steeped in a fetishizing of struggle, pain and oppression." Other reviewers were more positive, for example Jasmine Steele from Sojourners wrote: "In Full Color, Rachel is portrayed to be a highly intelligent and creative person."

See also

The Rachel Divide
Black Lives Matter

References

2017 non-fiction books
Autobiographies
Books about transracialism
Collaborative memoirs
BenBella Books books